Rezvanshahr (also Romanized as Reẕvānshahr) is a city in the Central District of Tiran and Karvan County, Isfahan Province, Iran.  At the 2006 census, its population was 3,642, in 1,132 families.

References

Populated places in Tiran and Karvan County

Cities in Isfahan Province